The 1st Cavalry Brigade of the Imperial Japanese Army was originally formed November 3, 1901. 
 
It was assigned to Kwantung Army in April 1933 as part of the IJA Cavalry Group. It was then assigned with the Cavalry Group to the Northern China Area Army in June 1938. Again with the Group it was assigned to the Mongolia Garrison Army in February 1939.

Organization 

1st Cavalry Brigade
 13th Cavalry Regiment
 14th Cavalry Regiment
 Brigade Mounted Artillery Regiment

Later additions
 Brigade Machinegun unit
 Brigade Anti tank artillery squadron
 Brigade Tank unit
 Independent Infantry Battalion (motorized)
 Independent Engineer Squadron (motorized)
 1st Mounted Artillery Regiment 
 71st Cavalry Regiment

Commanders 
 Yoshifuru Akiyama

See also 
 IJA Cavalry Units

References

Japanese World War II brigades
Military units and formations established in 1901